Uromacer is a genus of snakes in the family Colubridae endemic to the island of Hispaniola (in the Dominican Republic and Haiti).

Species
The following three species are recognized as being valid.
Uromacer catesbyi 
Uromacer frenatus 
Uromacer oxyrhynchus 

Nota bene: A binomial authority in parentheses indicates that the species was originally described in a genus other than Uromacer.

References

Further reading
Boulenger GA (1894). Catalogue of the Snakes in the British Museum (Natural History). Volume II., Containing the Conclusion of the Colubridæ Aglyphæ. London: Trustees of the British Museum (Natural History). (Taylor and Francis, printers). xi + 382 pp. + Plates I-XX. (Genus Uromacer, p. 115, including identification key to the three species).
Duméril A-M-C, Bibron G, Duméril A[-H-A] (1854). Erpétologie générale ou histoire naturelle complète des reptiles. Tome septième. Première partie. Comprenant l'histoire des serpents non venimeux. Paris: Roret. xvi + 780 pp. (Uromacer, new genus, pp. 719–720). (in French).

Uromacer
Snake genera
Taxa named by André Marie Constant Duméril
Taxa named by Gabriel Bibron
Taxa named by Auguste Duméril
Snakes of the Caribbean